Johnny Powless (born March 15, 1993 in Six Nations, Ontario) is an Iroquois professional lacrosse player. Powless currently plays for the Toronto Rock of the National Lacrosse League and the Oakville Rock of Major Series Lacrosse. Powless won NLL Championships in each of his first three seasons, and has also won two Mann Cups with the Chiefs.

NLL career
Powless was drafted 5th overall by the Knighthawks in the 2011 entry draft. After winning the NLL Championship with the Knighthawks in his first season (2012), Powless was also given the NLL's Sportsmanship Award. The Knighthawks went on to win the 2013 and 2014 NLL Championships, giving Powless three NLL titles at the age of 21.

Statistics

NLL
Reference:

Awards

References

1993 births
Living people
Iroquois nations lacrosse players
Lacrosse people from Ontario
Native American sportspeople
Rochester Knighthawks players
Vancouver Warriors players
Minnesota Swarm players
Georgia Swarm players
First Nations sportspeople